The Thomai is a popular and one of the best known dances of Greece (Macedonia (Greece)), Bulgaria (Blagoevgrad Province) and North Macedonia. As is the case with most Greek, Bulgarian and Macedonian folk dances, it is danced in circle with a counterclockwise rotation, the dancers holding hands.

See also 
 Greek dances

References

External links

Greek music
Greek dances
Macedonian dances
Bulgarian dances
Macedonia (Greece)
Macedonian music
Petros Gaitanos songs
Glykeria songs
Areti Ketime songs
Songwriter unknown
Year of song unknown